The following lists events that happened during 1994 in the Grand Duchy of Luxembourg.

Incumbents
 Grand Duke – Jean
 Prime Minister – Jacques Santer
 Deputy Prime Minister – Jacques Poos
 President of the Chamber of Deputies – Erna Hennicot-Schoepges
 President of the Council of State – Jean Dupong (to 18 May) Paul Beghin
 Mayor of Luxembourg City – Lydie Polfer

Events

January – March
 January - The section of the A13 motorway between Schifflange and Kayl opens.

April – June
 20 May - The section of the A1 motorway between Croix de Gasperich and Irrgarten opens.
 3 June - Sections of the A13 motorway between Sanem and Lankelz and Esch-sur-Alzette and Schifflange open.
 12 June – Legislative and European elections are held.  There is little change in the balance of power, although The Greens and ADR successfully consolidate their new-found positions.
 13 June – Jacques Santer forms a new government, keeping Jacques Poos as his deputy.

July – September
 15 July – Jacques Santer is designated as the successor to Jacques Delors as President of the European Commission, to take up the post on 23 January 1995.
 24 September – Prince Guillaume marries Sibilla Sandra Weiller Torlonia.

October – December
 1 November – SES launches its fourth satellite, Astra 1D.
 19 December – The old town and fortifications of Luxembourg City are made a UNESCO World Heritage Site.

Unknown
 Unknown – The Netherlands' Frans Maassen wins the 1994 Tour de Luxembourg.

Deaths
 14 January – Jean Goldschmit, cyclist
 19 July – Émile Schaus, politician and writer
 1 September – Father Jean Bernard, writer and clergyman
 26 October - Emile Kirscht, painter

Footnotes

 
Years of the 20th century in Luxembourg
Luxembourg